This is a list of awards and nominations received by the American film composer Thomas Newman.

As of 2017, Newman has received a total of fifteen Academy Award nominations, however, he has yet to win the award, making him the most nominated living composer to have never won an Oscar, equal to Alex North, who also received 15 unsuccessful nominations. Thirteen of his nominations are in the Best Original Score category, whilst one is for Best Original Song.

He has also received four Golden Globe nominations including two for Best Original Score for 1999's American Beauty and 2019's 1917 and two for Best Original Song, as well as eight Grammy nominations and six wins.

Major Associations

Academy Awards
The Academy Awards are a set of awards given annually for excellence of cinematic achievements. The awards, organized by the Academy of Motion Picture Arts and Sciences, were first held in 1929 at the Hollywood Roosevelt Hotel. Newman has been nominated for fifteen awards.

{| class="wikitable
|-
! scope="col" style="width:1em;"| Year
! scope="col" style="width:35em;"| Category
! scope="col" style="width:40em;"| Nominated work 
! scope="col" style="width:5em;"| Result
! scope="col" style="width:1em;"| Ref
|-
| rowspan=2 | 1995
| rowspan=2 | Best Original Score
| The Shawshank Redemption
| 
| rowspan=15 | 
|-
| Little Women
| 
|-
| 1996
| Best Original Musical or Comedy Score
| Unstrung Heroes
| 
|-
| 2000
| rowspan=6 | Best Original Score
| American Beauty
| 
|-
| 2003
| Road to Perdition
| 
|-
| 2004
| Finding Nemo
| 
|-
| 2005
| Lemony Snicket's A Series of Unfortunate Events
| 
|-
| 2007
| The Good German
| 
|-
| rowspan=2 | 2009
| WALL-E
| 
|-
| Best Original Song
| 'Down to Earth' from WALL-E
| 
|-
| 2013
| rowspan=5 | Best Original Score
| Skyfall
| 
|-
| 2014
| Saving Mr. Banks
| 
|-
| 2016
| Bridge of Spies
| 
|-
| 2017
| Passengers
| 
|-
| 2020
| 1917
| 
|-style="border-top:2px solid gray;"

BAFTA Film Awards
The BAFTA Award is an annual award show presented by the British Academy of Film and Television Arts. The awards were founded in 1947 as The British Film Academy, by David Lean, Alexander Korda, Carol Reed, Charles Laughton, Roger Manvell and others. Newman has received two awards from six nominations.

{| class="wikitable
|-
! scope="col" style="width:1em;"| Year
! scope="col" style="width:35em;"| Nominated work
! scope="col" style="width:40em;"| Category
! scope="col" style="width:5em;"| Result
! scope="col" style="width:1em;"| Ref
|-
| 2000
| American Beauty
| rowspan=6 | Best Original Music
| 
| rowspan=6 | 
|-
| 2009
| WALL-E
| 
|-
| 2013
| Skyfall
| 
|-
| 2014
| Saving Mr. Banks
| 
|-
| 2016
| Bridge of Spies
| 
|-
| 2020
| 1917
| 
|-

Golden Globe Awards
The Golden Globe Award is an accolade bestowed by the 93 members of the Hollywood Foreign Press Association (HFPA) recognizing excellence in film and television, both domestic and foreign. Newman has received four nominations.

{| class="wikitable
|-
! scope="col" style="width:1em;"| Year
! scope="col" style="width:35em;"| Nominated work
! scope="col" style="width:40em;"| Category
! scope="col" style="width:5em;"| Result
! scope="col" style="width:1em;"| Ref
|-
| 2000
| American Beauty
| Best Original Score – Motion Picture
| 
| rowspan=4 | 
|-
| 2009
| "Down to Earth" from WALL-E
| rowspan=2 |Best Original Song – Motion Picture
| 
|-
| 2011
| "The Living Proof" from The Help
| 
|-
| 2020
| 1917
| Best Original Score – Motion Picture
| 
|-

Primetime Emmy Awards
{| class="wikitable
|-
! scope="col" style="width:1em;"| Year
! scope="col" style="width:35em;"| Nominated work
! scope="col" style="width:40em;"| Category
! scope="col" style="width:5em;"| Result
! scope="col" style="width:1em;"| Ref
|-
| 1991
| Against the Law
| rowspan=3 | Outstanding Main Title Theme Music
| 
| rowspan=3 | 
|-
| 2002
| Six Feet Under
| 
|-
| 2019
| Castle Rock
| 
|-

Other awards

References 

Newman, Thomas